Robert Vessy (died 1430) was an English politician.

He was a Member (MP) of the Parliament of England for Exeter in March 1416 and 1422. He was Mayor of Exeter in 1425–26.

References

Year of birth missing
1430 deaths
English MPs March 1416
English MPs 1422
Members of the Parliament of England (pre-1707) for Exeter
Mayors of Exeter